Emperor Huizong of Western Xia (1060–1086), born Li Bingchang, was the third emperor of the Tangut-led Chinese Western Xia dynasty, ruling from 1067 to 1086.

After his father's sudden death, Huizong assumed the throne at the young age of six. His mother, Empress Dowager Liang (Chinese: 梁太后,), became the regent for the rest of Huizong's reign. In 1076, Huizong turned sixteen, and was supposed to assume direct control of the throne, but was stopped by the enormous influence of the Dowager. The two sparred over the cultural policy of the empire: the Emperor Huizong supported sinicization, while the Empress Dowager Liang supported Tangutization (ironic, considering Huizong was of paternal Tangut heritage, and Liang was of ethnic Han heritage). Empress Dowager Liang eventually had Huizong put under house arrest; as a result, Huizong requested the Song dynasty for help. The Song Dynasty then invaded the Western Xia on the premise of freeing Huizong, but the invasion was repelled.

Empress Dowager Liang then forced Huizong to marry her niece, who would also become a powerful empress dowager. Thus, the Western Xia had two different Empress Dowager Liang.

He was depressed by the control of his mother, and Huizong later died at the young age of 26.

Huizong was succeeded by his son, the Emperor Chongzong.

Family 
Consortsand issues:

 Empress Zhaojian, of the Liang clan (昭簡皇后梁氏, d.1099)
 Emperor Chongzong of Western Xia, personal name Qianshun (乾順), furst son
Prince of Jin Chage (晉王差哥),second son

References

1060 births
1086 deaths
Western Xia emperors
11th-century Chinese monarchs
11th-century Tangut rulers